Kurt Shaw (born 1 April 1999) is a Maltese footballer who plays as a defender or midfielder for Sliema Wanderers and the Malta national team.

Career
Shaw made his international debut for Malta on 12 October 2019 in a UEFA Euro 2020 qualifying match against Sweden, which finished as a 0–4 home loss.

Career statistics

International

References

External links
 
 
 

1999 births
Living people
Maltese footballers
Malta youth international footballers
Malta under-21 international footballers
Malta international footballers
Association football midfielders
Sliema Wanderers F.C. players
Maltese Premier League players